Newcastle Street is a road in Perth, Western Australia. It connects Leederville with East Perth, starting from Oxford Street and ending at Lord Street, crossing a number of roads leading north out of Perth including Loftus Street, Charles Street, Fitzgerald Street, William Street, and Beaufort Street.

History
Newcastle Street is named after Henry Pelham-Clinton, 5th Duke of Newcastle, who was Secretary of State for the Colonies from 1852 to 1854.

It has been in the past parts of major bus routes leaving Perth. The tramline (closed in the 1950s) along William Street also crossed Newcastle Street.

The street has also been identified in name, by schools and businesses.  The Newcastle Street State School was at 478–482 Newcastle Street. It was sometimes also named the Newcastle Street Infants School, as well as the Newcastle Street Primary School or  even Newcastle Street School.

It has been in the scope of the Northbridge Urban Renewal project.

Major intersections

References

Roads in Perth, Western Australia